His Majesty the King is a sculpture-object made by Joan Miró in 1974 and now part of the permanent collection of the Fundació Joan Miró in Barcelona.

History 
Miró lived to see the fall of the Falange regime after the death of Francisco Franco in 1975, along with the transition to democracy in Spain.

In his acceptance speech for an honorary doctorate from the University of Barcelona in 1979, Miró discussed the civic responsibility of the artist: "I understand that an artist is someone who, in the midst of others’ silence, uses his own voice to say something and who makes sure that what he says is not useless, but something that is useful to mankind."

Description 
His Majesty the King, along with Her Majesty the Queen and His Highness the Prince are part of a series of sculptures—as was often the case with Miró, composed from found objects. The everyday origins of the items comprising the sculptures implicitly contradict the majesty of the works' titles.

The creative activity, artistic expression in Joan Miró is an experience closely related to their physical and social environment. The roots in the earth to the cosmos, the objects quotidiants, simple, often linked to rural areas are sources of inspiration to stimulate your ability to dream and give a universal work. The found objects, features traditional objects from the peasant environment of Montroig are transformed into sculptures. The choice of these materials by Miró is not aesthetic but is attracted to each object that radiates energy.

2011 Exhibition
The exhibition L'escala de l'evasió that opened in October 2011 was supported by access to Wikipedia using QRpedia codes that allowed access to visitors in Catalan, English and several other languages.

References

Further reading 
 
 
 
 
 

Sculptures by Joan Miró
1974 sculptures
Found object
Culture in Barcelona